Short Order is a 2005 Irish drama film written and directed by Anthony Byrne. It was released in Ireland on 1 March 2005. Later on during the Dinard Festival of British Cinema, it was released in France on 6 October 2005. It was released at Newport Beach International Film Festival on April 26, 2006, in the US and was later released as Life Is A Buffet on 16 May 2008. Spain saw the release at Seville Film Festival on 7 November 2006. The Germany release was on 25 October 2012. Some parts of the dialogues are versed in German, Spanish and Italian, during the course of the movie, interactions between the casts, etc. The movie's primary language is English and some segments are in other languages.

Plot
Fifi is an accomplished young chef who is constantly hounded with offers for her talents. Her food is so delicious that it takes on sexual symbol of its own and no one can look at food in the same way again. The film (drama) takes the viewers through the life and daily (night life here) of the chefs and the way they look at the work and how much they crave about food.

Awards
The film has got 3 awards and has been nominated 7 times.
Won
Irish Film and Television Awards in 2005 for Best Production Design for Film.
Eleanor Wood and Laura Bowe won the award.
Nominated
Tatiana Ouliankina - Best Supporting Actress in a Feature Film
Anthony Byrne - Best Director
Anthony Byrne - Best Script for Film
Judith Williams - Best Costume Design for Film
Niall Byrne - Best Music in a Film
J. Patrick Duffner - Best Editing in Film/TV Drama
Ray Cross, Nikki Moss, John Fitzgerald and Peter Blayney - Best Sound in Film/TV Drama
Won
Monaco International Film Festival in 2006 for Best Newcomer (actress) and Best Actor.
Cosma Shiva Hagen - Best Newcomer
Rade Serbedzija - Best Actor

Cast
Following is the list  of the cast members for the short drama about the food and culinary culture of the chefs. Short Order was filmed mostly on sets in (Studio Bendestorf bei Hamburg, Bendestorf, Lower Saxony, Germany), and most of the songs were performed by Emma de Caunes.
Emma de Caunes as Fiona (Fifi Koko)
Rade Šerbedžija as Paulo Federico
Cosma Shiva Hagen as Catherine
Jack Dee as Harry Melville
Paul Kaye as Burt Stone, The Cable Show Guy
Vanessa Redgrave as Marianne
John Hurt as Felix
Jon Polito as Tony
Paschal Friel as Pedro
Tatianna Ouliankina as Stephanie (Stefani)
Vincent Fegan as Master Chef / Sebastian Gruel
Frédéric Andrau
Eamonn Hunt as Jerry
Terrence Orr as Butler
John Henry as Sinatra
Tommy O'Neil as Dapper Gent
Marc Copeland as Barman
Frederic Andrau as Peirre
Roger Gregg as Lenny Green

Soundtracks

References

External links

2005 films
Irish drama films
2005 drama films